Herreninsel (old name: Herrenwörth) is a 238 hectare island in Bavaria's largest lake, Chiemsee. It is the biggest of three main islands, Fraueninsel and "Krautinsel" joining it to form the municipality of Chiemsee.

Herreninsel is famous for the Herrenchiemsee palace of Ludwig II of Bavaria. Never completed, it was only inhabited by the king for nine or ten nights before he mysteriously died of drowning at age 40.

The island is inhabited by about 30 people, Frauenchiemsee some 300. It is also the site of a previous royal home, the Old Palace Herrenchiemsee, a former Augustinian monastery (Monastery Herrenchiemsee).

External links
 Bavarian Palace Department
 
 

Lake islands of Germany
Islands of Bavaria
Rosenheim (district)